The Pragathi Bhavan is the official residence and principal workplace of the Chief Minister of Telangana. Located at Greenlands Road, Punjagutta, Hyderabad in Telangana. It was designed by the Indian architect, N.Niroop Kumar Reddy.

History
The new complex was the brainchild of Chief Minister of Telangana, K. Chandrashekar Rao, to help perform his duties without interruption. 10 IAS Officers quarters and 24 peon quarters at officers’ colony were demolished to construct the new complex. The official name stands for, Pragathi meaning progress and Bhavan for a large house or building.

The Gruhapravesam (housewarming) was performed on 23 November 2016 at 5.22 AM by the Chief Minister of Telangana, K. Chandrashekar Rao, with traditional rituals performed by Chinna Jeeyar Swamy.

Design influences
Designed by noted Indian architect, Hafeez Contractor. It has classical inspiration sources, found in neoclassical & Palladian style. The building design cues are found in historical buildings in erstwhile princely State of Hyderabad like the Koti Residency and Falaknuma Palace.

Suddala Sudhakar Teja was the vaastu consultant for the entire complex.

Architecture
The front facade is a columned portico. The columns are on the periphery, giving large, unhindered, open-spaced halls and rooms

Construction
Construction of the Pragathi Bhavan started in March 2016, without a formal event, and completed in November 2016, in a record time of nine months. The entire complex was constructed by Mumbai-based construction company, Shapoorji Pallonji, at a cost of INR ₹38 crore (US$5.4 million) . The construction work was expedited with 200 workers, working day and night at the site.

The building complex
The east-facing building complex has a combined built-up area of over 1,00,000 sq ft, on a land area of 9 acres (3.64 hectares). The entry point into the new complex is on the north east corner. There is a small Maisamma temple inside, the decades old temple too was rebuilt in a new location. The five buildings – the residence, Chief Ministers Office, Janahitha (meeting hall), the old CM residence and Camp Office are referred as the Pragathi Bhavan.

Layout plan
The complex is divided into two parts; the residence has a bigger slice and the other half is for the Chief Minister's Office and Janahitha. The entrance for residence is separate from office and meeting hall. The office and Janahitha are located adjacent, to the south of the residence.

Residence
The residence is on a rectangular shaped plot with two floors, and built on an acre of land, with floor area of 40,000 square feet. The residence has a theater-cum-auditorium with a capacity to seat 250 people.

On the south of the residence, it has home garden on an acre land, planted with ayurvedic and other trees on the periphery, chosen by the chief minister himself. The large open ground in the front, is used to address the public, and can accommodate 5000 people.

Chief Minister’s Office (CMO)
The two storied Telangana CMO building is the Official Secretariat of the Chief Minister of Telangana. Earlier, the CMO known as the CM Peshi was located on the 6th floor of C Block in the Telangana Secretariat was facing space crunch. Pragathi Bhavan is the heart of state administration.

The CMO has a mini conference hall, a hall for video conferences and has hotline connections to all main offices in every mandal headquarters. Earlier, large high-level meetings were held at star hotels or other conference halls. The offices include chambers for Chief Minister secretaries and administrative staff.

Janahitha
Janahitha is a large public meeting hall, with a capacity to accommodate over 1000 people. It was inaugurated on 17 February 2017, on the birthday of Telangana CM, KCR. It is single-floor building, with a floor-to-ceiling height of 24 feet, with a floor area of 15,000 sq ft. It was named as Janahitha , meaning good for the people. It is modeled on the lines of Mughal emperor, Akbar's People’s court, Diwan-i-Aam, where he met with his courtiers and subjects to discuss their issues.

The Chief Minister holds important policy meetings with secretaries, collectors, official review meetings and meeting public representatives. It is also used to interact with citizens of the state like farmers, workers, employees, artisans etc. It also has a large lounge area, used by the CM for interacting with daily visitors.

Security
The tightly monitored zone has compound walls 15-feet high, electric fence. The ventilators and windows have bulletproof glass and CCTVs, is manned by 55 security personnel, round the clock. For security reasons, the inside layout is closely guarded. The complex has a parking facility for over 300 cars.

Old Chief Minister's official residence

The former residence of the Chief Minister, Chief Minister's Camp Office, built in 2004, was considered inauspicious and Telangana Chief Minister stayed in it until new Pragathi Bhavan was built. Now, it is part of Pragathi Bhavan, and is used as a state guest house, and the camp office is now the Office of [Inspector General] (intelligence).

Chief Ministers in Pragati Bhavan
 Kalvakuntla Chandrashekhar Rao - 23 November 2016 – Present

Future plan
An adjacent plot of 10 acres is planned for building houses and camp offices for State’s Chief Secretary, Speaker of the Legislative Assembly, Director General of Police and Council Speaker.

See also
 List of official residences of India

References

Chief ministers' official residences in India
Government buildings in Telangana
Buildings and structures completed in 2014
Buildings and structures in Hyderabad, India
Chief Ministers of Telangana